Lankesteria is a genus of flowering plants belonging to the family Acanthaceae.

Its native range is Tropical Africa and it is found in the countries of Benin, Cameroon, Central African Republic, Congo, Ethiopia, Gabon, Ghana, Guinea, Ivory Coast, Kenya, Liberia, Mozambique, Nigeria, Senegal, Sierra Leone, Sudan, Tanzania, Uganda and Zaïre.

The genus name of Lankesteria is in honour of Edwin Lankester (1814–1874), an English surgeon and naturalist who made a major contribution to the control of cholera in London. It was first described and published in Edwards's Bot. Reg. Vol.31 (Misc.) on page 86 in 1845.

Known species
According to Kew:
Lankesteria alba 
Lankesteria barteri 
Lankesteria brevior 
Lankesteria elegans 
Lankesteria glandulosa 
Lankesteria hispida 
Lankesteria thyrsoidea

References

Acanthaceae
Acanthaceae genera
Plants described in 1845
Flora of West Tropical Africa
Flora of West-Central Tropical Africa
Flora of Northeast Tropical Africa